Wendy Elizabeth Lindsay is an Australian politician. She has been a member of the New South Wales Legislative Assembly since 2019, representing East Hills for the Liberal Party.

Lindsay was the Manager of the Bankstown Auburn Community radio station.  The station has a board of seven, around 50 volunteers and broadcasts in 12 languages and 3 religions, in addition to diverse programming in English including hip hop, motor sport and Australian music gig guides.

Election to parliament 
In August 2018, Glenn Brookes, the scandal-ridden incumbent Member for East Hills announced his intention to retire from the NSW Parliament at the next election. This resulted in the Liberal Party pre-selecting Lindsay for the ultra-marginal seat of East Hills in January 2019. She faced a strong challenge during the 2019 election campaign with both major parties taking a keen interest in the South-Western Sydney seat. Her main opponent was Labor Party candidate Cameron Murphy, a barrister and civil libertarian however the electorate narrowly elected Lindsay with a margin of 630 votes.

Lindsay was sworn in as a member of the Legislative Assembly on 23 March, and appointed chair of the Community Services Committee in June 2019.

References 

Year of birth missing (living people)
Living people
Liberal Party of Australia members of the Parliament of New South Wales
Members of the New South Wales Legislative Assembly
Women members of the New South Wales Legislative Assembly
21st-century Australian politicians
21st-century Australian women politicians